Bill Howell may refer to:

 Bill Howell (architect) (1922–1974), British architect
 Bill Howell (cricketer) (William Peter Howell, 1869–1940), Australian cricketer
 Bill Howell (American football) (Wilfred Daniel Howell, 1905–1981), American football player
 Bill Howell (politician) (William James Howell, born 1943), Speaker of the Virginia House of Delegates
 Bill Howell (graphic designer), American graphic designer, artist, set designer and photographer

See also
William Howell (disambiguation)